Dead Girl is an American film written, directed and starring Adam Coleman Howard and Anne Parillaud.

Plot
Ari Rose, an unsuccessful actor, falls for a beautiful woman named Helen-Catherine but strangles her when she rejects him. Ari then takes the dead woman home, has sex with her corpse, and comes to believe that she is still alive and in love with him. He's soon taking her out in public without anyone seeming to notice her condition.

References

External links

1990s English-language films
American comedy films
1996 films
1996 comedy films
CineTel Films films
1996 directorial debut films
1990s American films